In Bosnia and Herzegovina, including the Federation of Bosnia and Herzegovina, Republika Srpska and Brčko District, a local community is an administrative body of a single territorial unit that can include one or several populated places or parts of a populated place that constitutes a territorial whole. A local community is established on the initiative of the municipality president or a mayor or municipal/city council as well as civic associations, while the decision on the establishment is reserved for the municipal/city council. In the Federation of Bosnia and Herzegovina, legal communities are considered to be legal entities.

A local community consists of a council and a president or a council and an assembly of citizens. In the latter case, which exists in only five municipalities, the councils act as an executive body appointed by the assembly of citizens.

In total, there are 1,451 local communities within the Federation of Bosnia and Herzegovina. Out of 79 local self-governments or municipalities/cities, 78 of them have established local communities.

Footnotes

References 

 

Subdivisions of Bosnia and Herzegovina
Bosnia and Herzegovina 4
Fourth-level administrative divisions by country